Twin Princess of Wonder Planet is a 2005 Japanese anime television series based on Birthday's concept. The anime series was produced by Nihon Ad Systems under the direction of Junichi Sato and consists of 51 episodes. The story follows the adventures of the twin princesses of Wonder Planet (a mysterious planet shaped like a hollow earth).

Three pieces of theme music are used for the first Season 1 opening themes and two closing themes. The opening theme is  performed by Flip-Flap.

Episode list

References

External links
Official Japanese website

See also
 List of Twin Princess of Wonder Planet Gyu! episodes

2005 Japanese television seasons
2006 Japanese television seasons
Lists of anime episodes